Boothe is a surname. It is the alternate spelling of Booth. Notable people with the surname include:

Armistead L. Boothe (1907–1990), American politician
Chris Boothe, fictional character from the soap opera Passions
Clare Boothe Luce (1903–1987), American author and politician 
Demico Boothe, American author
Jill Kinmont Boothe (1936–2012), American skier
Ken Boothe (born 1948), Jamaican singer
Kevin Boothe (born 1983), American football player
Lorna Boothe (born 1954), Jamaican-born British athlete
Powers Boothe (1948–2017), American actor

See also 
Boothe Lake
Boothe Memorial Park and Museum
Booth (surname)
Booth (disambiguation)

English-language surnames